This is a listing of Woman's Clubhouses in the state of Florida that are on the U.S. National Register of Historic Places.

A number of them were considered for listing in a single study completed in 1998.

Individual
These clubhouses were submitted to the National Register individually, and are so listed there.

Clubhouses of Florida's Woman's Clubs MPS

The following buildings were added to the National Register of Historic Places as part of the Clubhouses of Florida's Woman's Clubs Multiple Property Submission (or MPS).

Other
At least one women's club is listed as a contributing building in a National Register historic district.

See also
List of women's club buildings

References

External links
 Index to Florida listings at Florida's Office of Cultural and Historical Programs

Woman's Clubhouses
Woman's Clubhouses
 Woman's Clubhouses
Woman's Clubhouses
Woman's Clubhouses in Florida
Clubhouses in Florida
 
Women's club
History of women in Florida